Camara, Câmara, Cámara is a surname. Notable people with the surname include:

Footballers
 Abdoulaye Camara (born 1980), Malian footballer
 Aboubacar M'Baye Camara (born 1985), Guinean footballer
 Fredson Camara Pereira (born 1981), Brazilian footballer
 Hassoun Camara (born 1986), French footballer
 Henri Camara (born 1977), Senegalese footballer
 Ibrahima Sory Camara (born 1985), Guinean footballer
 Kader Camara (born 1982), Guinean footballer
 Kémoko Camara (born 1975), Guinean footballer
 Mamadi Camara (soccer, born 1995), Guinean footballer
 Mamadi Camará (footballer, born 2003), Bissau-Guinean footballer
 Mangué Camara (born 1982), Guinean footballer
 Mohamed Ali Camara (born 1997), Guinean footballer
 Mohamed Mady Camara (born 1997), Guinean footballer
 Mohammed Camara (born 1975), Guinean footballer
 Oumar Camara (born 1992), French footballer
 Papa Camara (1951–2018), Guinean footballer and manager
 Sékou Camara (footballer, born 1985) (1985–2013), Malian footballer
 Souleymane Camara (born 1982), Senegalese footballer
 Titi Camara (born 1972), Guinean footballer
 Zoumana Camara (born 1979), French footballer

Others
 Assan Musa Camara (1923–2013), Gambian politician
 Babacar Camara (born 1981), Senegalese basketball player
 Fatou Kiné Camara (born 1964), Senegalese lawyer and women's rights campaigner
 Gora Camara
 Hélder Câmara (1909–1999), Roman Catholic Archbishop
 Javier Cámara (born 1967), Spanish actor
 Jessica Camara (born 1988), Canadian boxer
 Juan Rodríguez de la Cámara (1390-1450), Spanish poet
 Manuel de la Cámara (1835–1920), Spanish admiral
 Juan de la Cámara (1525–1602), Spanish Conquistador
 Moussa Dadis Camara (born 1964), Guinean army officer and president
 Sérgio Sette Câmara (born 1998), Brazilian racing driver

 Camara Laye (1928-1980), Guinean writer (this is a Mandinka name; the family name is Camara and precedes the given names)

See also
Kamara (surname)